Cornwall Island is a small, uninhabited island in the high arctic region of the Canadian territory of Nunavut. It is near the geometric centre of the Queen Elizabeth Islands. To the north, it is separated from Amund Ringnes Island by Hendriksen Strait. To the south, it is separated from Devon Island by Belcher Channel. It is the largest of six islands (the others being Buckingham, Ekins, Exmouth, Graham Island, and Table) in the Norwegian Bay, west of Ellesmere Island.

Coast features include Northeast Point and Gordon Head to the east; Pell Point and Cape O'Brien to the south; and Cape Butler in the southwest.

The first known sighting of the island was by Sir Edward Belcher on 30 August 1852 and was named in honour of Prince Edward, Prince of Wales and Duke of Cornwall.

Image gallery

References

Further reading

 Hambley, Gregory, and Scott Lamoureux. 2006. "Recent Summer Climate Recorded in Complex Varved Sediments, Nicolay Lake, Cornwall Island, Nunavut, Canada". Journal of Paleolimnology. 35, no. 3: 629–640.
 Lamoureux, Scott. 1999. "Catchment and Lake Controls Over the Formation of Varves in Monomictic Nicolay Lake, Cornwall Island, Nunavut". Canadian Journal of Earth Sciences. 36: 1533–1546.

Islands of the Queen Elizabeth Islands
Uninhabited islands of Qikiqtaaluk Region